Jacques Harold Edouard Debat-Ponsan (Copenhagen, 21 August 1882 - Paris, 1942) was a French architect.

Life 

Debat-Ponsan studied in the atelier of Victor Laloux at the École nationale supérieure des Beaux-Arts in Paris. He took the Prix de Rome in 1912 and was resident at the Villa Medici from January 1913 to February 1915.

Following the First World War, Debat-Ponsan was engaged in reconstruction projects, then in 1928 was named architect-in-chief of the French national Postes, télégraphes et téléphones administration (PTT).

Debat-Ponsan was the son of French painter Édouard Debat-Ponsan, and the uncle of French Prime Minister Michel Debré.

Work 

 Paris telephone central office for exchange "Ségur", 55 Avenue de Saxe (1900)
 urban planning and reconstruction of Cambrai, with fellow architects Pierre Leprince-Ringuet and Marc Germain Debré (beginning 1919)
 reconstruction of Driencourt (1920-1927)
 PTT Administration Building, 20 Avenue de Segur (1931-1939)
 Paris telephone central office for exchange "Suffren", Avenue de Suffren (1933)
 École Jean-Baptiste Clément, Boulogne-Billancourt (1934)
 Unité de formation et de recherche biomédicale des Saints-Pères at Paris Descartes University, with Louis Madeline and Armand Guéritte (begun 1936, interrupted by the war, dedicated 1953)
 Villa Douce, Reims, with Pol Gosset (1929-1932)
 City Hall at Boulogne-Billancourt, with Tony Garnier (1931–34)

References

External links 
 biography (in French)

1882 births
1942 deaths
20th-century French architects
Prix de Rome for architecture
École des Beaux-Arts alumni